J. A. "Daff" Gammons was an American football player and coach.

Daff may also refer to:

 Al Daff (1902–1991)m Australian film executive 
 Lily Attey Daff (1885–1945), New Zealand artist

DAFF may refer to:

 Danish American Football Federation
 Department of Agriculture, Fisheries and Forestry (disambiguation)
 Department of Agriculture, Forestry and Fisheries (South Africa)

DAfF may refer to:

 Deutsche Akademie für Fernsehen (German Television Academy)